Jeffrey Scott Gardner (born February 4, 1964) is an American former Major League Baseball infielder. After his playing career, Gardner was a manager in the Padres' minor league system from  until .

Gardner attended Orange Coast College. In 1984 he played collegiate summer baseball with the Harwich Mariners of the Cape Cod Baseball League and was named a league all-star. He was selected by the Houston Astros in the 14th round of the 1984 MLB Draft.

In , he was listed as a member of the Arizona Diamondbacks' professional scouting staff, based in Costa Mesa, California.

References

External links

1964 births
Living people
American expatriate baseball players in Canada
Arizona Diamondbacks scouts
Baseball players from California
Columbia Mets players
Eugene Emeralds managers
Harwich Mariners players
Iowa Cubs players
Jackson Mets players
Las Vegas Stars (baseball) players
Lynchburg Mets players
Major League Baseball second basemen
Montreal Expos players
New York Mets players
Orange Coast Pirates baseball players
Ottawa Lynx players
People from Newport Beach, California
San Diego Padres players
Tidewater Tides players